Phillip and Sala Burton Academic High School is an American secondary school in San Francisco, California. The founding of the school is a result of a consent decree ruling in 1984 between the City of San Francisco and the National Association for the Advancement of Colored People. First established in the Silver Terrace neighborhood, the current campus is located in Visitacion Valley at 400 Mansell Avenue, on the former site of Woodrow Wilson High School. The school is named after former U.S. Representatives Phillip Burton and his wife Sala Burton.

From January 2007 to May 2009, Leadership High School cohabited with Burton High School, as did Metropolitan Arts and Tech Charter School from May 2009 to May 2011.

History

Phillip & Sala Burton High School sits on the site of the former Woodrow Wilson High School, which had its first graduating class in 1964.

Phillip & Sala Burton Academic High School was established in 1984 under the court's guidance as a consent decree between the NAACP and the City and County of San Francisco.

Facilities 
Public radio station KALW bases its studios on the Burton campus.

The school opened its student wellness center in 2005, the seventh in the district.

Demographics

According to U.S. News & World Report, 98% of Burton's student body is "of color," with 73% of the student body coming from an economically disadvantaged household, determined by student eligibility for California's reduced-price meal program.

African-American enrollment has steadily declined in regards to the overall student enrollment. African-American families have left San Francisco for more affordable locales (in 1970 the city's African-American population was 13%; by 2006 the population had declined to 6%).

Wall-to-Wall Academy Model
Burton piloted the National Academy Foundation's wall-to-wall academy model for San Francisco. Following the freshman year, Burton students self-select into one of three career-themed academies. Students who elect to continue playing for one of the Burton bands elect to postpone their academy selection until their junior year. Each academy is designed to provide students with a relevant experience that is grounded in academic content. Students have the choice between engineering, health science, and media arts and entertainment. Over the course of their study, students partake in a wide range of field trips and job shadowing experiences. Guest speakers from the industry come to Burton to present and discuss with students what skills are necessary to pursue jobs in a particular industry. Additionally, guest speakers speak to the assortment of jobs that each industry actively recruits. Students have the option to participate in summer internships—some of which are paid! Collectively, academy students work as a class or as a member of a small group on a final project leading up to their graduation. All students commemorate their participation as a member of the academy with a celebration and a sash that adorns their graduation gown. The primary objective of the Burton wall-to-wall academy structure is to utilize the rigor, relevance, and articulation of the curricular program to fully engage students, thus reducing the truancy and dropout rates, closing the achievement gap, improving test scores, and increasing the graduation and college entrance rates.

Post-Secondary Success Plans
Burton High School works with the San Francisco Education Fund, a non-profit, that works to support schools on building and following through on their Post-Secondary Success Plans for graduates. Like other San Francisco high school graduates who elect to enroll in a two-year program like City College of San Francisco, only 10% of students leave the program in five years with any degree or certificate. However, 90% of Burton graduates who attend a four-year institution immediately following high school successfully complete their program within five years. Additionally, when compared to similar high schools in San Francisco, Burton graduates are more likely to attend a two-year program over the four-year program.

See also

San Francisco County high schools

References

External links
Official Website as of March 1, 2008
Great Schools profile on Burton HS

Public high schools in San Francisco
Educational institutions established in 1984
1984 establishments in California
San Francisco Unified School District schools